HDMS Lougen was a brig of 18 guns, launched in 1791, and the name-vessel of her class of six brigs designed by the naval architect Ernst Stibolt. She was the first Danish warship to be copper-sheathed. She was active protecting Danish merchant shipping and suppressing pirates in the Mediterranean and in the Caribbean. In March 1801, she fought off the British privateer Experiment and the 22-gun warship  in a single action. When the British captured the Danish West Indies in 1801, Lougen was part of the booty. The British later returned her to Denmark where she was broken up in 1802.

Service record
1793 – October 1794: Captained by Hans Michael Kaas, Lougen arrived at St Croix in the Danish West Indies on 29 June 1793, having captured a privateer en route.  In harbour on 14 August the ship rode out a severe hurricane with three heavy anchors, warp lines and other cables employed.  In October an epidemic of sickness swept through the various ships in the Danish West Indies, with sixteen deaths on Lougen alone. In April 1794 captain Kaas reported rumours that the British admiral Jerwis (sic) had threatened,, once he had finished with the French, to burn the town of St Thomas as it was a haven for pirates.

Returning to Denmark in October 1794 Lougen and three smaller ships repatriated 125 troublesome (striking?) house builders to Rostock.
1795–96: Danish home waters (Elbe and West Jutland) under the command of Captain Johan Hartvig Ernst von Berger.
1797–99: Mediterranean, in company with HDMS Thetis but not before the Battle of Tripoli (16 May 1797). The squadron of three frigates and two brigs had the duty of protecting Danish shipping from interference by the Bey of Tripoli.
1800–01: Danish West Indies.

On 1 September 1800, Lougen came to the rescue of the schooner Den Aarvaagne, when the latter was under attack by the British privateer Dreadnought. On Lougens approach, the privateer broke off the action.

Later in 1800, Lougen captured the privateer Eagle and brought the captured schooner into St Thomas.

Battle of West Kay

The two British ships approached the brig Lougen, under the command of Captain Carl Wilhelm Jessen, and the schooner Den Aarvaagne. Arab, commanded by Captain John Perkins, approached the two Danish vessels and, according to Danish accounts, without warning, fired several broadsides at Lougen before the Danish ship was able to return fire. Lougen, which had escaped serious damage, began to return fire steadily. Experiment initially attempted to capture Den Aarvaagne, but Den Aarvaagne obeyed orders to stay out of the fight and instead escaped south to Christiansted on St Croix with its intelligence on British actions. Experiment then joined Arab in the attack on Lougen, with the two British ships sandwiching the Danish ship. During the engagement, which lasted for over an hour, one of Lougens shots struck the Arabs cathead and loosed the bower anchor. (Perkins reported that it was the first shot from Lougen that loosed the bower anchor.) Arabs crew was unable to cut the anchor free, leaving Arab unable to manoeuvre effectively. This allowed Jessen to steer a course that brought Lougen under the protection of the shore batteries and then into St Thomas. The Danish government awarded Captain Jessen a presentation sword made of gold, a medal and 400 rixdollars (the equivalent of a whole year's salary for a captain in the Danish Navy) for his actions.

Fate
British naval and military activity in the area could not be countered. British forces took Lougen as a prize when they occupied the Danish West Indies in March. One year later, in 1802, the British returned Lougen to Denmark when peace was restored. The Danes later decommissioned the brig and she was broken up.

Notes

References

  The Danish Naval Museum is building a new website at which many details, drawings and models may be available. The English-language version of this website is still under construction (March 2016)
Balsved's Danish Naval History website

Ships built in Copenhagen
1791 ships
Ships designed by Ernst Wilhelm Stibolt
Brigs of the Royal Dano-Norwegian Navy
Captured ships